K'Waun Lamar Williams (born July 12, 1991) is an American football cornerback for the Denver Broncos of the National Football League (NFL). He played college football at Pittsburgh and attended Saint Joseph Regional High School in Montvale, New Jersey.

Early years
Williams played high school football for the Saint Joseph Regional High School Green Knights. He played running back, wide receiver and cornerback. He was an All-New Jersey selection. Williams recorded 32 tackles, two interceptions, two fumble recoveries, four rushing touchdowns, and four receiving touchdowns his senior year.

College career
Williams played from 2010 to 2013 with the Pittsburgh Panthers.

Professional career
Williams was ranked as the 92nd best cornerback prospect in the 2014 NFL Draft by DraftScout.com.

Williams went undrafted in the 2014 NFL Draft, but received offers for a tryout from the Cleveland Browns and Pittsburgh Steelers. Williams declined the offer to attend the Pittsburgh Steelers' rookie camp in order to reunite with Browns' defensive backs coach Jeff Hafley who was also his position coach at Pitt and recruited him out of high school.

Cleveland Browns

2014
On May 20, 2014, the Cleveland Browns signed Williams to a two-year, $930,000 contract.

Throughout training camp, Williams competed for a roster spot as a backup cornerback and special teams contributor against Isaiah Trufant, Aaron Berry, Pierre Desir, Leon McFadden, T. J. Heath, Robert Nelson, and Royce Adams. He also competed to be the backup nickelback against Isaiah Trufant. Head coach Mike Pettine named Williams the seventh cornerback on the Browns' depth chart to start the regular season, behind Joe Haden, Buster Skrine, Justin Gilbert, Pierre Desir, Robert Nelson, and Aaron Berry. Williams was also named the backup nickelback being Buster Skrine.

He made his professional regular season debut in the Cleveland Browns' season-opener at the Pittsburgh Steelers and made three combined tackles in their 30–27 loss. Williams was inserted at nickelback after rookie Justin Gilbert had issues in pass coverage and was replaced on the outside by nickelback Buster Skrine. He made his first career tackle on running back Le'Veon Bell after a nine-yard reception in the third quarter. On October 5, 2014, Williams collected a season-high six solo tackles, deflected a pass, and made his first career sack during a 29–28 victory at the Tennessee Titans in Week 5. Williams sacked backup quarterback Charlie Whitehurst for a six-yard loss in the third quarter. The following week, Williams earned his first career start, as a nickelback, and made a solo tackle and two pass deflections before exiting in the second quarter of the Browns' 31–10 win against the Pittsburgh Steelers in Week 6 due to a concussion. He was inactive for the Browns' Week 7 loss at the Jacksonville Jaguars due to concussion symptoms. In Week 11, he collected a season-high eight combined tackles and a pass deflection during a 23–7 loss to the Houston Texans. Williams was inactive for two games (Weeks 15–16) due to a hamstring injury. He completed his rookie season in 2014 with 38 combined tackles (29 solo), eight pass deflections, and a sack in 13 games and four starts.

2015
Williams entered training camp slated as the first-team nickelback after Buster Skrine departed for the New York Jets in free agency. Head coach Mike Pettine named Williams the third cornerback on the depth chart to start the season, behind Joe Haden and Tramon Williams. He was also officially named the first-team nickelback.

In Week 2, he made three solo tackles and sacked quarterback Marcus Mariota during a 28–14 victory against the Tennessee Titans. He was sidelined for two games (Weeks 4–5) after sustaining a concussion. In Week 10, he collected a season-high five solo tackles in the Browns' 30–9 loss at the Pittsburgh Steelers. Williams was inactive for the Browns' Week 15 loss at the Seattle Seahawks due to a shoulder injury. Williams finished the 2015 season with 39 combined tackles (31 solo), two pass breakups, three forced fumbles, two fumble recoveries, and a sack in 13 games and six starts.

2016
On August 12, 2016, Williams opted to not participate in the Cleveland Browns' pre-season opener due to an ankle injury. On August 18, 2016, the Cleveland Browns suspended Williams for two weeks and fined him for conduct detrimental to the team. The Browns argued the severity of Williams injury as he continued to sit out practice and received a second opinion. Williams received a second opinion from an independent specialist at the Cleveland Clinic and was told he would have to undergo surgery to remove bone spurs. Williams stated he planned to appeal the suspension and was also reportedly contemplating retirement. On August 29, 2016, the Cleveland Browns waived Williams.

Chicago Bears
On August 30, 2016, the Chicago Bears claimed Williams off of waivers. However, the contract was voided after Williams failed a physical due to his ankle injury.

On November 3, 2016, Williams underwent surgery to remove the bone spurs and was expected to recover within 12 weeks.

2017
After being medically cleared following surgery, Williams received contract offers from multiple teams, including the New York Jets, Minnesota Vikings, Detroit Lions, and San Francisco 49ers.

San Francisco 49ers
On February 21, 2017, the San Francisco 49ers signed Williams to a one-year, $615,000 contract with a signing bonus of $75,000. He reunited with San Francisco 49ers' defensive backs coach Jeff Hafley who was his position coach with the Cleveland Browns and at Pitt.

Throughout training camp, Williams competed against Will Redmond and Keith Reaser for the role as the first-team nickelback. Head coach Kyle Shanahan named Williams the first-team nickelback to start the regular season.

On September 29, 2017, the San Francisco 49ers signed Williams to a three-year, $8.85 million contract extension with $4.25 million guaranteed and a signing bonus of $3 million. On October 1, 2017, Williams collected a season-high eight combined tackles during an 18–15 loss at the Arizona Cardinals in Week 4. Williams was inactive for two games (Weeks 8–9) after injuring his quadriceps. On December 24, 2017, Williams recorded five combined tackles, deflected two passes, and made his first career interception during a 44–33 victory against the Jacksonville Jaguars in Week 16. He intercepted a pass by quarterback Blake Bortles and returned it for a 27-yard gain. He finished the 2017 season with a career-high 54 combined tackles (42 solo), five pass deflections, two forced fumbles, an interception, and a sack in 14 games and five starts. Pro Football Focus gave Williams an overall grade of 80.2, which ranked 44th among all qualifying cornerbacks in 2017.

On October 10, 2020, Williams was placed on injured reserve with a knee injury. He was activated on October 31. He was suspended two games by the NFL for violating the league's performance-enhancing drugs policy on November 24, 2020, but the suspension was rescinded the next day after testing issues were discovered.

On March 26, 2021, Williams re-signed with 49ers.

Denver Broncos
On March 23, 2022, Williams signed a two-year contract with the Denver Broncos.

Statistics

Source:

References

External links
Cleveland Browns bio
College stats

1991 births
Living people
African-American players of American football
Players of American football from Paterson, New Jersey
Saint Joseph Regional High School alumni
American football defensive backs
Pittsburgh Panthers football players
Cleveland Browns players
San Francisco 49ers players
21st-century African-American sportspeople
Denver Broncos players